Tomoki Suzuki (born 14 June 1994) is a Japanese wheelchair racer, who won the 2020 Tokyo Marathon, came second at the 2015,  2018 and 2021 Tokyo Marathons, and came third at the 2017 Tokyo and 2019 London Marathons. Suzuki competed in multiple events at the 2020 Summer Paralympics, and won a bronze medal in the mixed 4 × 100 metres relay.

Personal life
Suzuki was born on 14 June 1994 in Tateyama, Chiba, Japan. At the age of eight months, Suzuki was involved in a car accident that left him with paraplegia. He now lives in Tokyo.

Career
Suzuki competed at the 2009 Asian Youth Para Games, whilst at middle school. Whilst in secondary school, he was coached by Paralympian Nobukazu Hanaoka. He is now a member of Toyota athletics club.

Suzuki came second at the 2015 Tokyo Marathon. Suzuki's first senior world championships was the 2015 IPC Athletics World Championships in Doha, Qatar. He did not qualify for the 2016 Summer Paralympics in Rio de Janeiro. He finished second at the 2016 Oita International Wheelchair Marathon. He came third at the 2017 Tokyo Marathon. At the 2017 World Para Athletics Championships in London, Suzuki, Sho Watanabe, Yuki Nishi, and Hitoshi Matsunaga won the 4 × 400 metres relay T53/T54 race, by virtue of being the only finishers. He also came fifth in the 800 metres T54 event at the Championships.

Suzuki came second at the 2018 Tokyo Marathon; he finished one second behind race winner Hiroyuki Yamamoto, in a time of 1:26:24. In the same year, he finished second in the Oita International Wheelchair Marathon, one second behind winner Marcel Hug, and on the same time as third placed Yoo Byung-hoon. He also finished sixth at the New York City Marathon in a time of 1:40:28. Suzuki came third at the 2019 London Marathon, after breaking away from the main group alongside Daniel Romanchuk and Marcel Hug halfway through the race. In doing so, he qualified for the 2020 Summer Paralympics in Tokyo.

Suzuki won the 2020 Tokyo Marathon, after forming an early group with Hiroki Nishida and Sho Watanabe, and then taking the lead  into the race. His finishing time of 1:21:52 was a course record, and he won the race by eight minutes and eight seconds. After the race, Suzuki said he was disappointed that more top athletes, including Marcel Hug, were unable to race due to the COVID-19 pandemic. In December 2020, Suzuki was third in the Runner's World magazine World Para Male Athlete of the Year award, behind 2020 London Marathon winner Brent Lakatos, and David Weir, who came second at the 2020 London Marathon, and won the 400 metres event at the 2020 British Championships. Suzuki also won the Australia Day Oz Day 10K Wheelchair Road Race in 2018, 2019, and 2020.

At the 2020 Summer Paralympics, Suzuki came ninth in the final of the 1500 metres T54 event. He finished fourth in his heat of the 800 metres T54 event, and did not qualify for the final. He was part of the Japanese team that came second in their mixed 4 × 100 metres relay heat, and came third in the final. He came seventh in the marathon T54 race. Suzuki came second at the delayed 2021 Tokyo Marathon.

References

1994 births
Japanese marathon runners
Tokyo Marathon male winners
People from Tateyama, Chiba
Sportspeople from Chiba Prefecture
Living people
People with paraplegia
Athletes (track and field) at the 2020 Summer Paralympics
Medalists at the 2020 Summer Paralympics
World Para Athletics Championships winners